Cherryholmes was an American bluegrass band from Los Angeles, California, made up of six members of the Cherryholmes family: father Jere (Pop), mother Sandy Lee, daughters Cia Leigh, and Molly Kate, and sons B.J. and Skip.

History
In April of 1999, Jere and Sandy Lee took the family to a local bluegrass festival, and the family decided to play as a group.  Jere already played electric bass, acoustic guitar and the upright bass, and Sandy played guitar, fiddle, mandolin, and piano. Cia, then 15, began learning guitar and B.J. (11) and Molly (7) began on the fiddle. Skip (9) started with the mandolin. 

In July, 1999, they auditioned and were hired for their first gig at Oak Tree Village, Oak Glen.  They continued to play regularly as amateurs at bluegrass venues and festivals throughout southern California and Arizona.

In 2000 they turned professional, and in 2002 they sold their home and purchased a 26-foot travel trailer, traveling throughout the Midwest and the East. They earned enough in the first year to buy their first tour bus. In the spring of 2003 they arrived in Nashville, Tennessee at the Grand Ole Opry for their first appearance.

In 2005, they signed with Skaggs Family Records (musician Ricky Skaggs) and were later nominated for the IBMA categories 'Entertainers of the Year' and 'Emerging Artist of the Year', winning 'Entertainers of the Year'.

Columbia Artist Management (CAMI) booked them into theaters and performing arts centers, and eventually into performances with symphony orchestras around the country. They traveled nearly a million miles in their tour bus, playing at bluegrass, country, roots and rock venues, including Lincoln Center, Tennessee's Bonnaroo and CMA Music Festivals, Stage Coach in California. They performed regularly on the Grand Ole Opry. 

They received five Grammy nominations and a Dove Award nomination. Their music appeared on Gaither Music CDs and DVDs and appeared on PBS specials, including the award-winning Bluegrass Underground. In March, 2006 their story was featured in a Billy Graham Television special.

Cherryholmes toured Switzerland, France, Japan, the United Kingdom, Canada, and the Caribbean. 

On January 12, 2011, Cherryholmes announced they would disband, saying that the children needed to choose their own paths and to be free from the complexities of a family business.  Their last show was in Galax, Virginia,  May 7, 2011. 

Cia, B.J., Skip, and Molly went on to pursue individual careers.

The band reunited for a performance on September 26, 2015 at the Outer Banks Bluegrass Island Festival (Manteo, North Carolina).

Discography

References

External links 
Cherryholmes Official Site
Skaggs Family Records
Cherryholmes Brothers Facebook
Corporation Insania
Songs of the Fall
Mountain Heart

American bluegrass music groups
Jam bands
Musical groups from Los Angeles
1999 establishments in California